Julian "Tex" Robertson (April 23, 1909 – August 27, 2007) was an American swimmer and water polo player and a swimming coach for the University of Texas. He invented a flying disk game similar to the Frisbee.

Swimming career 
Julian Robertson was born April 23, 1909 in Sweetwater, Texas.  He later moved to California receiving the nickname "Tex".  When he was thirteen, he learned to swim in a nearby creek and often practiced his technique in a horse trough. The next year he won his first race. He attended the University of Michigan, where he swam for the Michigan Wolverines swimming and diving teams in NCAA and Big Ten Conference competition. While attending Michigan, he attended the 1932 Summer Olympics as an alternate member of the U.S. Olympic Water Polo team that won a bronze medal.  Between 1934 and 1935 Tex set new collegiate and Amateur Athletic Union records while continuing to win individual and team events for the University of Michigan. Meanwhile he also trained Adolph Kiefer for the 1936 Summer Olympics where Kiefer won a gold medal in the backstroke. In 1935, Tex founded the swimming team at the University of Texas. Tex had to convince UT that they needed a coach since the job was previously a student volunteer.  Although he did not get paid he made it work being the lifeguard of the university pool, servicing Coke Machines, and working at a camp in Michigan during the summer.  He brought attention to the UT swim team by recruiting incredible swimmers that ended up going to the Olympics.  While he coached from 1935–1950, the University of Texas swim team won every Southwest Conference Swimming Championship. In 1950 Tex retired as the UT Coach but not before winning the NCAA Coach of the Year. " Tex continued to improve Texas Swimming by creating WETS (Working Exes for Texas Swimming), and TAGS (Texas Age Group Swimming).

Burnet accomplishments 
Tex Robertson influenced the Burnet community by bringing accessibility and the importance of swimming to Burnet, TX.  For many years he taught the youth how to swim in Inks Lake before creating his summer camp.  In 1963, he brought the first public swimming pool to Burnet.  For thirty years that swimming pool hosted Burnet's small high school state championships.  In 1968, the girls' high school and college state championships were hosted there. He also invented the Blob, a highly used toy in all water based summer camps.

Camp Longhorn 
Robertson founded Camp Longhorn with his wife Pat in 1939 on Inks Lake in Burnet, Texas. The camp's main purpose was to teach children the importance of swimming and encouraged children to make swimming an active role in their lifestyle.  He shut the camp down for three years when World War II broke out so he could join the United States Navy, where he trained Underwater Demolition Teams and survival swimming skills.  He was stationed in San Diego and then transferred to Fort Pierce, FL where he taught the Underwater Demolition Teams.  Tex never quit coaching and led the Navy Swim Team to the National Navy Championships. When he returned, he spent all his time coaching the Texas swimming team and running Camp Longhorn, using his swim athletes as counselors. Many popular camp objects were inspired from World War II including a Vietnam-era, 40-foot long gasoline storage tank that was inflated and children jumped onto it while another flew off, along with ice cream lids children threw back and forth eventually becoming the Frisbee.  Vic Malfronte, the World Frisbee champion, gives credit to Tex for creating the earliest organized sailing disc games.  Tex grew up throwing metal can lids with neighborhood friends, and then introduced the game of throwing the "Sa-Lo" (which meant "sail it low") when he was a camper at Camp Wolverine in Michigan which is considered the birthplace of organized Frisbee. It was originally intended as a method for swimmers' times to be communicated to officials more quickly.  Robertson then introduced the Frisbee to his camp in 1939.  Retiring in 1950 as the UT swim coach, Robertson now focused entirely on the camp with his wife Pat.  The first year Camp Longhorn opened it only had one camper and sixteen counselors all swimmers from the University of Texas.  Today, the camp has spread into three different branches two located on Inks Lake (Camp Longhorn Inks Lake and C3) and the other, which opened in 1975, at Indian Springs, just a few miles east.  Inks Lake is fed off the Colorado River and Indian Springs is fed off of two private spring-fed lakes, both are located in the Hill Country. Tex came up with the term and famous slogan, "Attawaytogo" in 1939 to help campers encourage one another and realize that they are "somebody" at Camp Longhorn. The welcoming camp uses the term "Everybody is Somebody!" because Longhorn prides itself in the way each camper acts putting everything and everybody before themselves. Longhorn teaches all campers to love Camp and to be a friend and have friends with the camp's motto "Everybody is somebody at Camp Longhorn."  Robertson continued to run the camp until he died at age 98 and passed the camp down to his five children: Nan, Sally, Robby, Bill, and John.  Pat Robertson visited both during the camp sessions after Tex died until she died in 2015.  Today, Camp Longhorn hosts over 4000 campers every summer and the camp had their 75th anniversary in the summer of 2014.

References 

1909 births
2007 deaths
American swimming coaches
Texas Longhorns swimming coaches
Michigan Wolverines men's swimmers
People from Sweetwater, Texas
Sportspeople from Texas
United States Navy personnel of World War II
University of Texas at Austin faculty
American male water polo players
People from Burnet, Texas
20th-century American people